Archery UK is a magazine devoted to the sport of archery in the United Kingdom. It is the official journal of Archery GB, which has more than 40,000 members. The headquarters is in Hatfield, Herts.

History and profile
The magazine was first published in 1997. The first colour issue was produced in summer 2005. Since then there have been a number of redesigns and the pagination has grown from 40 to 84. The magazine is published by the Archery GB, based at the Lilleshall National Sports and Conferencing Centre, Shropshire. The magazine is published quarterly and is part of the membership package. It is also available online and in PDF format at the Archery GB website.

The first editor was Ann Shepherd. She was succeeded by Peter Jones and, in 2011, Jane Percival.

Contents
The magazine contains all the latest news about archery in the United Kingdom, as well as reports from club, national and international tournaments. Other regular features include:

 Expert tips on technique
 The latest development news
 The latest from Performance and Talent 
 Exclusives and competitions
 Junior news
 Product testing
 Reports from Archery GB's Chief Executive and Chairman
 Archery rankings, both national and regional
 The latest news from the Archery GB board, judges, coaches
 Tournament Diary and national tournament dates
 Achievements and records
 Letters from readers
 Directory of Contacts

References

1997 establishments in the United Kingdom
Archery in the United Kingdom
Magazines established in 1997
Quarterly magazines published in the United Kingdom
Sports magazines published in the United Kingdom
Mass media in Hertfordshire